Eric W. Kneedler is an American diplomat who is the nominee to be the next U.S Ambassador to Rwanda.

Early life and education
Kneedler earned his Bachelor’s degree from Pomona College, and his Master’s degree from the Johns Hopkins School of Advanced International Studies.

Career
Kneedler is a career member of the Senior Foreign Service, with the rank of Minister-Counselor. He currently serves as the Deputy Chief of Mission at the U.S. Embassy in Nairobi, Kenya, where he also served as Chargé d’Affaires, ad interim. Kneedler had also served as Counselor for Political Affairs at the Embassy in Nairobi, and held the same role at the U.S. Embassy in Manila, Philippines. Previously, Kneelder served as the Deputy Political Counselor at the U.S Embassy in Bangkok, Thailand, and as a Political Officer at the U.S. Embassy in Jakarta, Indonesia. Other assignments include Staff Assistant in the Bureau of European Affairs, a Senior Watch Officer in the State Department’s Operations Center, and various positions at the U.S. Embassy in Port Louis, Mauritius, and at the U.S. Consulate in Hong Kong.

Nomination for ambassador to Rwanda
On August 3, 2022, President Joe Biden nominated Kneedler to be the next ambassador to Rwanda. His nomination was not acted upon for the remainder of the year, and was returned to Biden on January 3, 2023.

President Biden renominated Kneedler the following day. His nomination is pending before the Senate Foreign Relations Committee.

Personal life
His foreign languages include Thai, Indonesian, and French.

References

Living people
American diplomats
United States Foreign Service personnel
United States Department of State officials
Pomona College alumni
Johns Hopkins University alumni
Year of birth missing (living people)